Assan Torrez Ceesay (born 17 March 1994) is a Gambian professional footballer who plays as a forward for  club Lecce and the Gambia national team.

Club career
In January 2020, Ceesay joined 2. Bundesliga side VfL Osnabrück, on loan from Swiss Super League club FC Zürich.

On 16 June 2022, Ceesay agreed to join newly promoted Serie A club Lecce on a two-year contract, with the option of a third, from 1 July when his contract with FC Zürich would expire. On 14 August 2022, Ceesay scored on his league debut as Lecce was condemned to a 1-2 defeat against Inter Milan at Stadio Via del mare.

International career 
Ceesay played in the 2021 Africa Cup of Nations, his national team's first continental tournament, where they made it to quarter-finals.

Career statistics

Club

International
Scores and results list Gambia's goal tally first, score column indicates score after each Ceesay goal.

References

1994 births
Living people
Sportspeople from Banjul
Gambian footballers
Association football midfielders
Gamtel FC players
Casa Sports players
FC Lugano players
FC Chiasso players
FC Zürich players
VfL Osnabrück players
U.S. Lecce players
Swiss Super League players
Swiss Challenge League players
2. Bundesliga players
Serie A players
The Gambia youth international footballers
The Gambia international footballers
2021 Africa Cup of Nations players
Gambian expatriate footballers
Gambian expatriate sportspeople in Switzerland
Expatriate footballers in Switzerland
Gambian expatriate sportspeople in Italy
Expatriate footballers in Italy